This Week in Baseball (abbreviated as TWiB, pronounced phonetically) is an American television series which focused on Major League Baseball highlights. Broadcast weekly during baseball season (and in its second incarnation, prior to marquee MLB games and during rain-delays) the program featured highlights of recent games, interviews with players, and other regular features. The popularity of the program, best known for its original host, New York Yankees play-by-play commentator Mel Allen, also helped influence the creation of other sports highlight programs, including ESPN's SportsCenter.

After its original syndicated run from 1977 to 1998, and gaining a revival in 2000 (which moved to Fox as a lead-in to its Saturday MLB coverage), TWiB was discontinued at the end of the 2011 Major League Baseball season, replaced by the new program MLB Player Poll.

History
When Commissioner Bowie Kuhn first took office in 1969, the only weekly showcase of Major League Baseball was its Saturday afternoon Game of the Week on NBC. On the other hand, the National Football League had produced its own syndicated highlight programs like This Week in Pro Football through its in-house unit NFL Films. In response to its competition, This Week in Baseball premiered in first-run syndication in 1977. The show was originally hosted by long-time New York Yankees announcer Mel Allen.

The program was typically picked up by stations that also had television rights to major league franchises like WTBS in Atlanta, KTTV in Los Angeles, and WGN in Chicago. TWIB would also air on owned-and-operated NBC stations as a prelude of sorts to NBC's Game of the Week telecasts.

According to Curt Smith's biography on Mel Allen entitled The Voice: Mel Allen's Untold Story, when NBC lost the rights to the Game of the Week to CBS (who, unlike NBC, didn't broadcast regular-season games for all 26 weeks of the season) after the 1989 season, TWIB, sans a strong anchor, proceeded to either lose markets or move to weaker, (often independent) stations. Even more so, TWIB was now (under the CBS umbrella) averaging a 1-2 rating and, in several places, airing at midnight (as opposed to, for example, WNBC New York at 1:30 p.m.; in this case, however, TWIB moved to WWOR, which had the rights to the New York Mets at the time, and aired on Sunday afternoons as the Mets' lead-in for their game telecasts).

End of the Mel Allen era
In 1996, Mel Allen died. Warner Fusselle, who had previously contributed the "TWIB Notes" and "TWIB Ticker" segments as well as substituting for Allen frequently in later years, and filled in for Allen when needed ultimately took over for the remainder of the season. In 1997, the recently retired Ozzie Smith became the new permanent host with Fusselle serving as the show's announcer and main contributor. TWIB had pretty much moved into being more of cable-syndicated show as in Detroit for instance, it was shown on PASS (Pro-Am Sports System). By this point, however, TWIB appeared to have run its course and the 1998 season proved to be the last for the original series.

From syndication to Fox
In 2000, Fox Sports decided to cancel its young-viewer-centered baseball series In the Zone (Fox's answer to NBA Inside Stuff) in favor of reviving This Week in Baseball. While the show was much more feature-driven than it had been before and was still targeted at the younger audience, the show retained some of the older features, such as plays of the week and the same open and closing themes.

Cam Brainard hosted and narrated the new series. For much of the show's run, a claymation version of Mel Allen introduced and closed the show.

Although all other children's programs were cancelled by Fox on December 28, 2008, TWIB was retained at least for the 2009 season, airing for the first time in high definition. It also aired on the MLB Network.

By the 2011 season, TWIBs ratings declined as the result of such shows as ESPN's Baseball Tonight and SportsCenter, which showed baseball highlights daily. The rise of baseball highlights on the internet and the MLB Network also sealed TWIBs fate. In 2012, Fox cancelled TWIB and replaced it with a new baseball-oriented show, MLB Player Poll.

Format

The show also aired on regional sports networks around the country, on Rogers Sportsnet in Canada, and was also often played as part of the pre-game entertainment on the TV screens of major league stadiums. From 2004-2005, segments of the show were hosted by U.S. fast-pitch softball sensation Jennie Finch.

In 2007, TWIB was slated for 26 episodes running from April to the end of September, focusing on stories of various clubs and different baseball themes each week. The segment "Front Row Fan" features celebrities reminiscing about their favorite baseball memories. Guests have included Tom Hanks, Bernie Mac, Alyssa Milano and Kevin James. There is also a play of the week section and TWIBIA, in which a trivia question is asked before the commercial break.

Highlights of the past week's action are used less frequently, except for a closing highlight reel set to popular songs. The highlight reel is named How 'Bout That?, in reference to Mel Allen's well-known catchphrase. Video is gathered from each of the 30 Clubs' Stadium Loggers, who compile highlights of each game and send them to MLB Productions in Secaucus, NJ.

The program also used educational segments to help it qualify for E/I status in the United States.

Episode status
Reruns of the 1977–1998 Mel Allen version of the show was aired on ESPN Classic in the 2000s and Fox Sports 1 in 2020 when the 2020 Major League Baseball season was postponed due to the COVID-19 pandemic.

Some episodes of the 1977–1998 version of the show is available for streaming online on Pluto TV and Prime Video in the United States.

Music
The opening theme music to TWIB is "Jet Set", composed by Mike Vickers, a former member of the original Manfred Mann band. "Jet Set" was first used as the theme for the original 1974–75 version of the game show Jackpot. When Fox brought TWIB back, a slightly revamped version of "Jet Set" was written.

The closing theme to the show is "Gathering Crowds", composed by John Scott. It is typically played over a montage of baseball's greatest moments, building to a crescendo with a punctuated three-note chord as the MLB logo slides into view. The piece has also been utilized to similar effect for montages and credits at the end of, for example, local TV newscasts.

References

External links
 
 
 80stvthemes.com—This Week in Baseball
 

1977 American television series debuts
1980s American television series
1998 American television series endings
2000 American television series debuts
2011 American television series endings
American sports television series
First-run syndicated television programs in the United States
Fox Broadcasting Company original programming
Major League Baseball on Fox
American television series revived after cancellation
English-language television shows